Tyrosine-protein kinase ITK/TSK also known as interleukin-2-inducible T-cell kinase or simply ITK, is a protein that in humans is encoded by the ITK  gene. ITK is a member of the TEC family of kinases and is highly expressed in T cells.

Function 

This gene encodes an intracellular tyrosine kinase expressed in T-cells.  The protein is thought to play a role in T-cell proliferation and differentiation. ITK is functionally important for the development and effector function of Th2 and Th17 cells.

Mice lacking ITK were shown to not be susceptible to asthma.

Structure 

This protein contains the following domains, which are often found in intracellular kinases:

 N-terminus – PH (pleckstrin homology domain)
 TH – Tec family homology domain (including Bruton's tyrosine kinase Cys-rich motif and Proline rich region)
 SH3 – (Src homology 3)
 SH2 – (Src homology 2)
 C-terminus – tyrosine kinase, catalytic domain

Interactions
ITK (gene) has been shown to interact with:

 FYN, 
 Grb2 and 
 KHDRBS1, 
 KPNA2, 
 LAT, 
 LCP2, 
 PLCG1, 
 PPIA, and
 WAS.

References

Further reading

Tyrosine kinases